Maria Alfredovna Glazovskaya (26 January 1912 – 20 November 2016) was a soil scientist and agrochemist. Honorary Professor of Moscow State University, an honorary member of the Russian Geographical Society and the Dokuchaev Society of Soil Science, Professor Emeritus of the University of Warsaw and an honorary doctor of the University of Sofia. She was vice president of the All-Union Society of Soil Scientists, a correspondent member of the International Commission for the use of land and a member of the Advisory Committee of the FAO-UNESCO. M.A. Glazovskaya was one of the top Soviet experts in the project of FAO/UNESCO Soil Map of the World.

Biography 
She was born in Saint Petersburg, the daughter of high-ranked Imperial official Alfred Graf von Keyserlingk (1861-1939) and Maria Fyedorovna Glazovskaya (1881-1963), she had younger full-sister Margarita Alfredovna (1916-1998) and three half-siblings from her father's marriage. She was of Baltic German descent.

In 1929 she graduated from high school in Kolpino at Leningrad and entered the Leningrad Agricultural Institute, a year later she moved into the geological and soil-geographical faculty of Leningrad State University. She graduated from the University in 1934 with specialty Soil science and was left for PhD study in Geographic and Economic Research Institute.

In 1937 she defended her thesis for the degree of candidate of geographical sciences. After the defense she worked as an assistant at the Department of Soil Geography Geography Faculty of Leningrad State University, and actively participated in the expeditions of the Soil Institute Dokuchaev USSR.

From 1939 to 1952 she lived in Alma-Ata, in charge of the sector of soil genesis of the Institute of Soil Science of Kazakhstan, taught soil science and soil geography at the Kazakh Pedagogical Institute. In 1952 she moved to Moscow, where in the same year she defended her doctoral thesis on Inner Tien-Shan as a mountainous country in Central Asia. Since 1952 Associate Professor, since 1954 - professor, in 1956-1959 - Head of the Department of Physical Geography of the USSR, in 1959-1987 - Head, and from 1987 to the present time assistant professor of the department of geochemistry landscape and geography Soil Geography Faculty of Moscow State University.

At Moscow University in the Faculty of Geography she lectured on the following: Fundamentals of Soil Science and Soil Geography, Soils of the World, Geochemistry of Landscapes of the USSR, The Geochemical Features of Micro-organisms, Geochemistry of Natural and Man-made Landscapes of the USSR.

In December 2014 she was granted the status of Legend from the Russian geographical society for outstanding achievements in the field of geographical sciences, education and upbringing of young people.

Awards
 Medal For Valiant Labour in the Great Patriotic War 1941–1945 (1945)
Order of the Badge of Honour (1961)
Order of the Red Banner of Labour (1971)
Honored Scientist of the RSFSR (1978)
 Medal Veteran of Labour (1984)
 USSR State Prize (1987)
 Honorary Professor of Moscow State University (1994)

Literature
 Основы почвоведения и география почв. Географгиз, М., 1960 (в соавт. с И. П. Герасимовым)
 Геохимические основы типологии и методики исследования природных ландшафтов. М., 1964
 Почвы мира, т.1. М, 1972; т.2, 1973
 Общее почвоведение и география почв. М., 1983
 Геохимия природных и техногенных ландшафтов СССР. М., 1988
 Методологические основы оценки эколого-геохимической устойчивости почв к техногенным воздействиям. М., 1997
 География почв с основами почвоведения. М., 1995; 2005 (в соавт. с А. Н. Геннадиевым)
 Педолитогенез и континентальные циклы углерода. М.,2009
 События моей жизни на фоне войн и революций ХХ века. М., 2013

References

External links
 Profile Maria Glazovskaya official RAS site

1912 births
2016 deaths
Saint Petersburg State University alumni
Recipients of the Order of the Red Banner of Labour
Recipients of the USSR State Prize
Russian centenarians
Russian geographers
Russian memoirists
Russian soil scientists
Russian women geologists
Soviet geographers
Soviet women scientists
Women centenarians
Soviet soil scientists